The SPCA of Monterey County is a nonprofit, independent, donor-supported humane society located in Salinas, California that has been serving the animals and people of Monterey County since 1905.  It is notable for its collaborative programs with other local non-profit civic organizations.  Collaborations developed by the Monterey County SPCA have been used as models for animal protection programs throughout the U.S.

History 
The Monterey County SPCA has served the Monterey County area for over one hundred years.  Since its establishment in 1905 the organization has provided shelter for abandoned, stray and orphaned animals, medical service for injured animals, and educational programs for people of all ages. It offers adoptions and has a low cost spay and neuter clinic as well as other services. There are many collaborative fund raisers and programs that the organization participates in, in addition to wildlife conservation efforts.

Like any other non-profit organization, the SPCA relies heavily on not only financial donations but also on volunteers donating their time to various jobs – from clerical or bookkeeping services to odd jobs on the  grounds.

At the time of its founding in 1905 the main focus of the SPCA of Monterey County was to address the issue of "stray dogs and cats about town." Additionally the organization looked to discuss the "different diseases prevalent among horses" and "investigate the abuse and fast driving of donkeys and horses."

The location of the first meeting to establish the SPCA was the Methodist Episcopal Church on Lighthouse Avenue in Pacific Grove, California. The organization continued to operate after the church was torn down in 1963 and went on to become a safe haven for neglected and abused pets and injured and/or orphaned wildlife. According to one of the local newspapers, the SPCA shelter in its early years was a home for “833 dogs, 1050 cats, a horse, 5 cows, a bull, 4 goats, 13 rabbits, 23 chickens, 3 ducks, 5 deer, a pigeon, a coyote, 2 raccoons, an opossum, 3 white rats, a pheasant, a pelican, 2 seagulls, a parrot, a canary, a squirrel and a snake.”

Services

Spay and Neuter Clinic 
The SPCA provides a low cost spay and neuter clinic which provides not only spaying and neutering but also operations such as rabies vaccinations and microchip implants. The spay and neuter clinic was created by the organization in an attempt to reduce animal fights, stray animal population and spread of disease in the community.

Pet Adoptions 
Animals at the shelter that are considered to be suitable as pets are put up by the organization for pet adoption. In order for an animal to put up for adoption, the must meet health criteria and pass temperament tests, which are carried out be the organization's own staff of behavior evaluators.

Collaborations

PetMeals Program for People & Pets
In collaboration with the local Meals on Wheels organization, the SPCA of Monterey County runs a program which lifts the financial burden of providing food for pets for people who are physically impaired or on a fixed income. Volunteers deliver pet food provided by the SPCA and its supporters in addition to the standard food delivery. The program relieves the concern that people who receive food from Meals On Wheels will not feel the need to share it with their pets. BestPet Care & Supplies in Pacific Grove, Harden Ranch Veterinary Hospital in Salinas and The Feed Trough in Salinas also help to support this program. Volunteers are needed on a weekly basis to help label and prepare the pet food for delivery. Donations to help purchase the pet diets as specified by the meal recipients may be sent to the SPCA's “Pet Meals Delivery Fund.”

American Red Cross 
When flooding in Monterey County left people and their pets homeless in 1995, the SPCA was asked by emergency American Red Cross shelters to help with the hundreds of evacuating pets. The SPCA has provided housing, rescue, and medical services for displaced and stranded animals. In this instance they were able to set up temporary animal shelters as well as care for evacuating pets just outside the emergency shelters so people could safely evacuate, with their pets, without worry. This was the first time a collaboration of this kind had been attempted in the United States and it has now become the model for many other animal protection organizations.

The Salvation Army 
Every holiday season, the SPCA gathers pet food, supplies, and toys for individuals and families in need who have pets. The donations are then distributed by The Salvation Army in Monterey County. Many needy families in the community are pet owners who love their pets but are having a difficult time providing food for their families. The partnership assures food for the whole family during the holiday season and reduces the risk of families being forced to give up their pets because they can't afford to feed them.

Shelter Outreach Plus 
Health Department regulations prevent human service agencies from allowing pets in homeless shelters. Unfortunately this prohibition can prevent people in need of services, who also happen to own pets, from receiving needed temporary shelter. In response to this need, the SPCA provided dog houses and material to construct dog runs to Shelter Outreach Plus so their homeless clients can comfortably utilize their services without worry about their pets.

Research and Conservation

Wildlife Rescue and Rehabilitation 
The SPCA Wildlife Center is the only full service wildlife rehabilitation center serving Monterey County.
Each year, the SPCA Wildlife Center admits over 2,000 animals for treatment and care. The species of animals received ranges from large animals such as bobcats, deer, opossums, hawks, owls, and pelicans, to small animals, including squirrels, turtles, hummingbirds, swallows, and more.

Serving the entire Monterey County area, the Wildlife Center provides a resource for people who encounter wildlife in need while also providing care for exotic pet animals that are lost or surrendered to the SPCA. In addition to receiving animals brought in by the public, Wildlife Center staff members are on call 24 hours a day, every day of the year, to respond to wildlife emergencies and provide transport and care to animals in distress.

The Wildlife Center functions in part as an emergency hospital for animals that are sick or injured. Common problems include wildlife hit by cars, birds caught by cats or baby birds that have fallen from nests. The Wildlife Center also acts as a nursery for the hundreds of nestling birds and infant mammals orphaned each spring. Many wild animals are orphaned as a result of human activities such as spring tree trimming or unnecessary rescue. While the Wildlife Center has a team of dedicated and highly trained staff, its accomplishments would not be possible without the many volunteers who donate their time each week.

Ventana Wildlife Society 
Working to reintroduce the California condor to the wild, the Ventana Wildlife Society (VWS) approached the SPCA with an interesting dilemma: condors needing medical treatment had to endure a four-hour round trip between the mountains of Big Sur and the offices of local wildlife specialist Dr. Mike Murray of the Avian & Exotic Clinic in Monterey. Dr. Murray generously donates his services to both VWS and the SPCA's Wildlife Center. Since the SPCA is privileged to reside on over  pristine of Monterey County habitat, they can provide a small and very secluded area for recovering condors and VWS staff. This area, complete with temporary housing provided by VWS, is a ten-minute trip from needed veterinary medical services.

Education

Hartnell College Animal Health Technology Program
The budget crises in California have had many ramifications for the people and pets of Monterey County. One that directly impacts the SPCA is the possible discontinuance of the Animal Health Technology (AHT) Program at Hartnell College. All veterinary practices in the community as well as the SPCA's Gwen May Spay/Neuter Clinic require Hartnell's skilled Registered Veterinary Technician graduates to continue delivering quality medical care for the animals. To assist during this time of uncertainty the SPCA opened its doors as a temporary home for the AHT program during the Spring 2004 semester while its current site is torn down and the future of the program is debated. AHT classes will be conducted in the SPCA Spay/Neuter Clinic & the George Whitell Education Center, with scheduling that ensures no decrease in SPCA programs or services.  The SPCA is hopeful that this beginning collaboration will mature into a long-term, mutually beneficial, cost-effective program that provides great benefit to the residents and animals of our community.

Animal Camp 
The SPCA's week-long summer day camp has offered children a unique mix of exciting and educational hands-on experiences. Animal Camp builds self-esteem and nurtures compassion in students by instilling in them a sense of stewardship and wonder for the world around them. Program topics include California's endangered species, animal habitats and behavior, and simple ways to protect the environment. A highlight each year is the tour of the SPCA's Wildlife Rescue and Rehabilitation Center to see how staff care for injured and orphaned animals. Attendees hear about animal-related jobs from professional guest speakers and have plenty of time for creative art and drama activities before receiving their graduation certificates.

Sources
 [montereyherald.com]

External links
 SPCA for Monterey County - official site
Animal shelters in the United States
Animal welfare organizations based in the United States
1905 establishments in California
Wildlife rehabilitation and conservation centers
Non-profit organizations based in California
Monterey County, California